Northleigh is a village and civil parish in East Devon, Devon, England.

Northleigh may also refer to:

People 

 Henry Northleigh (1643–1694), Member of Parliament for Okehampton
 Stephen Northleigh, 18th-century Member of Parliament for Totnes

Places 
Northleigh, Alberta, Canada
Northleigh, North Devon, a location close to Goodleigh, Devon, England

See also 
North Leigh, Oxfordshire, England
North Leigh F.C.